Manuel Antonio Pérez Sánchez (July 12, 1900 – January 28, 1930), better known as Manuel Antonio, was a Galician poet. He was honoured on Galician Literature Day in 1979.

External links
 

1900 births
1930 deaths
Writers from Galicia (Spain)